John Steinmann (1914–1987) was an American architect. He designed St. John's Lutheran Church (Evansville, Wisconsin) (1958), listed on the National Register of Historic Places. Steinmann's father was an architect, and his son would become one as well. He was born in Monticello, Wisconsin and studied at the University of Illinois, Champaign-Urbana campus. He established his practice with his brother Howard Steinmann. His work includes high schools and residential buildings including the Prudhon House (1967) at 245 Clifton Street in Evansville, Wisconsin. He died in Madison, Wisconsin. Steinmann was influenced by Frank Lloyd Wright.

Work
 Karakahl Inn in Mount Horeb, Wisconsin
 Wisconsin Pavilion for the 1964 New York World’s Fair, relocated to the edge of Neillsville, Wisconsin
 St. John's Lutheran Church, Evansville, Wisconsin
 Donald Beger House (1948)
 Clarence Gonstead Chiropractic Building (Gonstead Clinic of Chiropractic)
 Dr Maxine Bennett house in Madison, Wisconsin
 Maxine Bennett house (circa 1956)

References

1914 births
1987 deaths
University of Illinois alumni
Architects from Wisconsin
20th-century American architects
People from Monticello, Green County, Wisconsin